John Paul Gerber (February 12, 1945 – June 12, 2010) was an American author, historian, librarian, and sportsperson.

Personal life 
Gerber was born in Sioux Falls, South Dakota, the eldest of 5 children born to John and Millie Gerber. As a youth his family moved to in Stillwater, Oklahoma then during his teens in Menomonie, Wisconsin. Gerber earned a B.A. in history from the University of Minnesota, a PhD in history from the University of Wisconsin, and an MLS from Simmons College. He spent much of his professional career as an archivist at Harvard Law School and a medical librarian for the Boston Healthcare System.

Scootering 
Gerber had a passion for European motorscooters, such as Vespas, Lambretta, and Heinkels, owning dozens of various scooters, putting over 412,000 miles riding his bikes on 5 continents, and according to the Boston Globe was "the world's foremost historian on the development, manufacture and spread of motor scooters as a practical means of everyday and leisure transportation." 

Gerber rode his first bike at age 14 and by 21 he had ridden almost 40,000 miles traveling around the US and Canada. In 1966 he embarked on the first of his epic rides going  from Minnesota to Panama and back on a Vespa GS 160. In 1971, he completed a  solo trip on his Vespa motor scooter from Wisconsin down the east coast of South America to the Tierra del Fuego. He returned up the west coast and was on his way to Alaska when the trip was cut short by a car totaling his scooter in Hayward, California.

Death
Gerber died on June 10, 2010 in Quincy, Massachusetts, aged 65, from pancreatic cancer.

Books
 John Paul Gerber.  Pannekoek and the socialism of workers' self-emancipation, 1873-1960, Springer, New York, 1989. 250 pages 
 John Paul Gerber.  Militants against the apparatus: the Communist opposition in France, 1923-1932, University of Wisconsin, Madison 1973. 412 pages

Articles
 An American Story by John Gerber, Veteran Vespa Club Journal, Winter 2004/5
 Weird and Wonderful No. 1: The AMI by John Gerber, Veteran Vespa Club Journal, Autumn 2006
 Weird and Wonderful No. 2: The Harley Davidson Brezza by John Gerber, Veteran Vespa Club Journal, Winter 2006/7
 Weird and Wonderful: The NSU Maxima by John Gerber, Veteran Vespa Club Journal, Spring 2007
 Weird and Wonderful: The Csepel Tunde by John Gerber, Veteran Vespa Club Journal, Summer 2007
 Larry Hagman: Greenwich Village Bohemian and Vespa enthusiast by John Gerber, Veteran Vespa Club Journal, Summer 2009
 Weird and Wonderful: The Swiss Army Vespa by John Gerber, Veteran Vespa Club Journal, Autumn 2009
 The sorry tale of the demise of the Hoffmann Vespa by John Gerber, Veteran Vespa Club Journal, Winter 2010/11
 Hans Stuck and Vespa by John Gerber, Veteran Vespa Club Journal, Spring 2011

References 

Long-distance motorcycle riders
People from Sioux Falls, South Dakota
Writers from Boston
University of Minnesota College of Liberal Arts alumni
 University of Wisconsin–Madison College of Letters and Science alumni
1945 births
2010 deaths
People from Stillwater, Oklahoma
People from Menomonie, Wisconsin
Deaths from pancreatic cancer
Deaths from cancer in Massachusetts